Simimyidae is a family of extinct rodents from North America.

References 

Dipodoid rodents
Prehistoric rodent families
Extinct animals of the United States
Eocene first appearances
Eocene extinctions